The North Park Formation is a geologic formation in Wyoming. It preserves fossils dating back to the Neogene period.

See also

 List of fossiliferous stratigraphic units in Wyoming
 Paleontology in Wyoming

References
 

Neogene geology of Wyoming
Neogene Colorado